British and Commonwealth Holdings plc was a financial services company which used to be a constituent of the FTSE 100 Index.

History
The Company was originally established in 1955 when Clan Line Steamers was merged with Union Castle to form The British & Commonwealth Shipping Company, a shipping business. Until 1987 its major shareholder was Caledonia Investments, which since 1951 has been controlled by Clan Line's founding Cayzer family.

British & Commonwealth were the ultimate owners of British United Airways (BUA), Britain's largest wholly private, independent airline of the 1960s, as well as its subsidiaries and sister companies, including British United Air Ferries and British United Island Airways (BUIA). They were also a shareholder of Bristow Helicopters, at the time the UK's biggest helicopter company as well as one of the largest in the world, acquiring full control in 1985.

In 1969 British and Commonwealth Shipping, Furness Withy, P&O and The Ocean Steamship Company established Overseas Containers Limited to exploit containerisation.

In late 1970 British & Commonwealth sold BUA along with three new BAC One-Eleven 500 aircraft it had leased to the airline to Caledonian Airways for £12m. It continued to own BUIA, which had changed its name to British Island Airways (BIA) in July 1970.

1980s boom and bust
In the 1980s, new management under John Gunn oversaw  rapid expansion in financial services. This wasn't a totally new area for the company: it had established fund managers Gartmore in 1969. Multiple acquisitions included Exco International, a UK money brokering business in 1986, and Oppenheimer, a large American fund management company.

At its height, the company was said to be "the largest financial services company in the UK, if the 4 high-street banks are excluded". Favourable profiles in the business press culminated in John Gunn being awarded the accolade "Guardian Young Businessman of the Year".

In 1988 it acquired Atlantic Computers plc, a computer services business for £434m, having first built up a stake in that company by way of a series of market purchases. The acquisition proved ruinous – "accounting irregularities" were discovered in Atlantic's books: the company had been building up huge contingent liabilities due to its 'Extended Paperwork' practice.

Both acquiror and acquiree subsequently went into administration (the former in 1990, the latter during the late 1990s). Until its collapse, British & Commonwealth had also been the majority shareholder of Air UK, at the time the UK's largest regional airline and BIA's successor, and also Servisair the airline and cargo ground handling company based, at the time, in Bramhall.

See also
Re Atlantic Computer Systems plc (No 1)

Notes

References
 
 

Defunct companies based in London
Companies formerly listed on the London Stock Exchange
Financial services companies established in 1955
1955 establishments in England
Financial services companies disestablished in 1990
1990 disestablishments in England